Catumbi is a neighborhood in Rio de Janeiro, Brazil and includes the Morro da Mineira favela.

References

Neighbourhoods in Rio de Janeiro (city)